Jim Marthinsen (born 15 April 1956) is a retired Norwegian hockey goaltender who played for Vålerenga Ishockey and for the Norwegian national team. He participated at the Winter Olympics in 1980, 1984, 1992 and 1994. He was seven times Norwegian Champion with the club Vålerenga, and three times with Storhamar. He was awarded Gullpucken as best Norwegian ice hockey player two times.

References

External links

1956 births
Living people
Norwegian ice hockey goaltenders
Ice hockey players at the 1980 Winter Olympics
Ice hockey players at the 1984 Winter Olympics
Ice hockey players at the 1992 Winter Olympics
Ice hockey players at the 1994 Winter Olympics
Norwegian ice hockey coaches
Olympic ice hockey players of Norway
Ice hockey people from Oslo
Storhamar Dragons players
Trondheim Black Panthers players
Vålerenga Ishockey players